Jenkin Lloyd Jones (November 14, 1843 – September 12, 1918) was a Unitarian minister in the United States, and also the uncle of Frank Lloyd Wright. He founded All Souls Unitarian Church in Chicago, Illinois, as well as its community outreach organization, the Abraham Lincoln Centre. A radical modernist, he joined the "Unity Men" and stressed a creedless "ethical basis" as the common element for churches. He tried to move Unitarianism away from a Christian focus and became a prominent pacifist at the time of World War I. He was a founder and long-time editor of Unity, a liberal religious weekly magazine.

Early life

Jenkin Lloyd Jones was born near Llandysul, a farming town in Cardiganshire, Wales. He was the seventh of ten children born to Richard Lloyd Jones and Mary Thomas James. In 1844, the family emigrated to the United States and settled in Ixonia, Wisconsin, supported by Richard's brother, also named Jenkin. After ten years, Richard and his family moved to Spring Green, Wisconsin.

Civil War service and its influence
Jones, often called "Jenk", enlisted in 1862 in the 6th Battery of the Wisconsin Volunteer Army. His military service included the battles of Vicksburg, Missionary Ridge, Chattanooga, Lookout Mountain and Atlanta. He suffered a broken foot at Missionary Ridge that required him to walk with a cane for the rest of his life. His experiences during the war convinced him that people must find another way to settle their differences. After he was mustered out of the army, Jones became an outspoken pacifist.

Jones returned to the family farm in Wisconsin after the war. He soon told his family that he had had a religious experience and decided to study for the ministry. In 1866, he enrolled in the Meadville Theological School in Meadville, Pennsylvania, a Unitarian institution that later became part of Meadville Lombard Theological School. Many of his classmates were also veterans of the war, and he soon became a class leader. He examined the implications of the theory of evolution on ideas about God in his commencement paper, "Theological Bearings of Development Theory."

Marriage and family

Jones met Susan Charlotte Barber during his time in Meadville. Susan Barber was born May 15, 1832 in New York as the eldest daughter of English immigrants, John Barber and Susan Cartwright. The Cartwrights were Unitarians and had moved to Meadville seeking a like-minded community. Susan studied informally at the theological school while working as secretary to the school's founder, Harm Jan Huidekoper, and his son, Professor Frederic Huidekoper. They married after Jones graduation in 1870 and spent their honeymoon in Cleveland, Ohio at the annual meeting of the Western Unitarian Conference (WUC). Then the couple returned to Spring Green, where Jenk's mother died soon after.

Jenkin and Susan had two children: Mary and Richard Lloyd Jones; Richard became the owner of the Wisconsin State Journal and then of the Tulsa Tribune.

Career as a Unitarian minister

Missionary work

Jones became the minister of the Liberal Christian Church in Winnetka, Illinois in 1870. However, he resigned this position in less than a year because he felt it too limiting. He returned to Wisconsin to become a traveling missionary.  As a missionary, he founded churches in Racine, Madison, Baraboo and Whitewater. He also worked with the First Independent Society of Liberal Christians in Janesville.

In 1875, the WUC hired Jones part-time as Missionary Secretary. He travelled extensively, going as far as California, from then until 1882. His work in this position included helping to find ministers to fill vacant pulpits and attending conferences, installations, ordinations and dedications. In 1876, he was also named Corresponding Secretary of the WUC and liaison to the American Unitarian Association (AUA). Jones was also one of the founders of Unity, a weekly publication, in 1878. He became editor the following year and held that position for the rest of his life.

The combination of pastoral duties and missionary work caused health problems, so Jones decided to quit his missionary position in 1880. Instead, the WUC made the Missionary Secretary a full-time position. Jones resigned the Janesville pastorate and retained his WUC job. He and his family moved to the new WUC headquarters in Chicago.

All Souls Church (Chicago)
The Jones family travelled to Wales in 1882, where Jenk preached and met with family members and other Unitarians. After they returned to Chicago, he met with a dozen members of the nearly defunct Fourth Unitarian Church. By the following year, he had led its reorganization as All Souls Church. In 1884, he resigned his position with the WUC to serve the rest of his life as minister of All Souls.

In 1895, the church bought land for a new building that would house both the church and its related social services. The latter included a gymnasium, classrooms, library and reading rooms. This building was completed in 1905 and named the Abraham Lincoln Centre.

Peace advocacy

At the turn of the twentieth century, most Unitarians were peace advocates. Although Jones had served in the Civil War and believed that the ending of slavery was a positive outcome, he also believed that war was a bad thing. This caused him to preach openly against the Spanish–American War and the subsequent American intervention in the Philippines.

In 1915, Henry Ford sponsored an international conference in Stockholm. He chartered a ship, thereafter known as the Henry Ford Peace Ship, to bring a large delegation of American peace activists to the conference. Jones was one of this delegation. The conference failed to stop the war and was largely discredited in the American press. Support for the war grew until the United States joined the conflict in 1917. The Chicago Peace Society did not speak out against the war, angering Jones to the point of withdrawing his membership.

He continued to publicly oppose the war, both in speaking and writing. In 1918 Chicago's postmaster, citing the Emergency Act of 1917, prohibited the mailing of Unity. Jones petitioned to have the suspension lifted. This was granted shortly before his death.

Later years
His wife's health began to decline in the mid-1890s. She suffered from hearing loss and severe headaches, which prevented her from participating in Jenk's work. Susan died of appendicitis in 1911.

In 1915, Jones married Mrs. Edith Lackersteen, a long-time co-worker at the Abraham Lincoln Centre.

Jones died on September 12, 1918 in Tower Hill, Wisconsin. An obituary listed the cause of death as "shock following an operation." His body was interred in the churchyard of Unity Chapel.

Footnotes

External links

 Abraham Lincoln Centre, founded by Jones
 "Heralds of a Liberal Faith: Jenkin Lloyd Jones (1843-1918)"
 
 

1843 births
1918 deaths
People from Ceredigion
People from Crawford County, Pennsylvania
People from Chicago
People of Wisconsin in the American Civil War
People from Ixonia, Wisconsin
People from Spring Green, Wisconsin
Welsh emigrants to the United States
American Unitarian clergy
American magazine editors
Union Army soldiers
American anti-war activists
Frank Lloyd Wright